Eucalyptus polyanthemos, commonly known as red box, is a species of small to medium-sized tree, that is 
native to eastern Australia but has been introduced into other countries. It has fibrous bark on the trunk and larger branches, smooth greyish to cream-coloured bark above, or smooth bark throughout. It has broadly egg-shaped to round juvenile leaves, lance-shaped, egg-shaped or almost round adult leaves, flower buds in groups of seven, white flowers and barrel-shaped to conical fruit.

Description
Eucalyptus polyanthemos is a tree that typically grows to a height of  but does not form a lignotuber. It has fibrous or flaky bark on the trunk and larger branches, smooth mottled greyish, cream-coloured and yellow bark above, or sometimes smooth bark throughout. It often has a crooked trunk and is noted for its domed canopy of greyish foliage. Veins on the leaves are distinct and the marginal vein is notably distant from the leaf edge.

Flowering occurs in October and November (spring in Australia) and the flowers are white.

Taxonomy and naming
Eucalyptus polyanthemos was first formally described in 1843 by Johannes Schauer in Walpers' book Repertorium Botanices Systematicae. This description was based on  the type specimen which was collected in 1822 near Bathurst by Allan Cunningham. The specific epithet (polyanthemos) is from the ancient Greek poly- meaning "many" and anthemon meaning "flower'.

The names of four subspecies are accepted by the Australian Plant Census.
 Eucalyptus polyanthemos subsp. longior Brooker & Slee was first formally described in 1996 in the journal Muelleria from a type specimen collected from north of Waygara. It is a taller tree with rough bark and lance-shaped adult leaves.
Eucalyptus polyanthemos subsp. marginalis Rule was first formally described in 2004 from a type specimen collected near Tottington, Victoria.
Eucalyptus polyanthemos Schauer subsp. polyanthemos, the autonym, has mostly smooth bark which is shed in large plates or scales and occasionally persists on the trunk.
Eucalyptus polyanthemos subsp. vestita L.A.S.Johnson & K.D.Hill was first formally described in 1960 in the journal Telopea from material collected near St Andrews, Victoria. The trunk and larger branches of this subspecies usually have grey-brown, flaky or fibrous bark

Distribution and habitat
Subspecies longior is found in taller forest in the foothills of far eastern Victoria.  Subspecies marginalis is also found in Victoria, between the Greater Bendigo National Park and Stawell with outliers near Bacchus Marsh. It grows in forest or woodland in dry, gravelly soils. 

Subspecies polyanthemos grows on the slopes and tablelands of central and southern New South Wales  where it is widespread on the central and southern slopes and tablelands. Subspecies vestita is found in Victoria and New South Wales. It grows in woodland south from Gulgong but with a small outlier population in the upper Hunter Valley. It is widespread in Victoria east of Ararat, growing on poor stony soils, usually on ridges and slopes.

Ecology
The larvae of the moth species Trichiocercus sparshalli and the eucalyptus leaf mining sawfly Phylacteophaga froggatti feed on the leaves. Large, old trees may form hollows that are used as nests for owls including the barking owl (Ninox connivens).

It has been recorded as an invasive species in California It is an introduced species in California where it is known as silver dollar gum, redbox or redbox gum.

Significant trees
A red box in Fraser National Park is recorded on the Significant Tree Register of the National Trust of Australia in Victoria. It is an unusual form with contorted limbs which is estimated to be around 80 years old and is 26.7 metres high.

In Gilmore in the Australian Capital Territory, a tree known as Murumbeeja Scarred Red Box No 1 is listed on the Register of the National Estate. It is a scarred tree, marking the removal by aborigines of bark, probably for canoe construction.

Uses

Use in horticulture
The species is noted for its drought tolerance. Although usually considered to be slow growing, newly planted trees may have their growth rate enhanced with improved soil, good drainage and irrigation in the first two years. The species is resistant to Armillaria root rot.
 A minimum temperature of -10 °C (15 °F) is required for cultivation.

Use in floristry
The juvenile foliage is used in floral arrangements.

Timber
The timber is red in colour and is strong, hard and durable. It has been used for fence posts, railway sleepers and firewood.

See also
 List of Eucalyptus species

References

Flora of New South Wales
Flora of the Australian Capital Territory
Flora of Victoria (Australia)
Trees of Australia
polyanthemos
Myrtales of Australia
Plants described in 1843